The , also known as , is a Shi'i commentary on the Quran by Ali ibn Ibrahim al-Qummi (died 919). It is based on the method of quoting hadiths from the Imams. Most of these hadiths were transmitted by al-Qummi's father, who was one of Muhammad ibn Ya'qub al-Kulayni's teachers.

Structure
The  comprises at least two different s that have been combined: one by Ali ibn Ibrahim al-Qummi himself, and the other by Abu al-Jarud Ziyad ibn al-Mundhir, a companion of the fifth Imam Muhammad al-Baqir who later became the eponymous founder of the Jarudiyya (an early Zaydi sect). Abu al-Jarud's  had been appended to the first by the latter's first transmitter, Abu al-Fadl al-Abbas ibn Muhammad.

References
Tahoor Encyclopedia: Ali Ibn Ibrähim Qomi commentary

External links
www.tashayyu.org/tafsir/qummi
howzeh-meybod.ir/quran/fa/Tafsirbooks,20 

Shia tafsir